Joseph Michael Bray (26 October 1886 – 22 July 1955) was an Australian rules footballer who played with Melbourne in the Victorian Football League (VFL).

Notes

External links 

1886 births
Australian rules footballers from Melbourne
Melbourne Football Club players
1955 deaths
People from Richmond, Victoria